The 1977–78 Syracuse Orangemen men's basketball team represented Syracuse University as an independent during the 1977–78 NCAA Division I men's basketball season. Led by second-year head coach Jim Boeheim, the Orangemen compiled a record of 22–6. Syracuse received an at-large bid to the 1978 NCAA Division I Basketball Tournament, where they lost in the first round of the Mideast Regionals to Western Kentucky.

Roster

Schedule

References 

Syracuse
Syracuse Orange men's basketball seasons
Syracuse
Syracuse Orange
Syracuse Orange